Japurá is a municipality located in the Brazilian state of Amazonas. Its population was 2,251 (2020) and its area is 55,791 km² (21541 Mi2). It forms the Japurá microregion together with the municipality Maraã (to the east of the Japurá municipality). The southern border of both the municipality and the microregion is the Japurá River.

The municipality contains the Juami-Japurá Ecological Station, which covers the entire Juami River basin.
The municipality contains 55% of the  Auatí-Paraná Extractive Reserve, created in 2001.
It contains part of the  Alto Rio Negro Indigenous Territory, created in 1998.

References

Municipalities in Amazonas (Brazilian state)